Diana Groó (born 10 September 1973) is a Hungarian film director and screenwriter.

Education 
In 1992 Groó attended JATE BTK and ELTE BTK where she studied French Language and Judaism. Beside her university studies she worked as assistant director of Judit Elek and Pál Schiffer at Hunnia Filmstúdió. In 1995 she was admitted to Academy of Drama and Film in Budapest where she studied directing in the class of Sándor Simó.

Career 

Groó's first success came with the short documentary Trapé (1996), which was her first year exam work at the Film Academy. The film tells the story of Erwino, a 70 year old Hungarian trapeze artist of a travelling circus, who decided to perform his show again after a long break. Groó followed her protagonist and lived with the travelling circus for 6 months which was made her possible to film not only the eagerly awaited moment of the premiere but also to reveal the secret Nazi past of the old artist. Groó received her first festival recognition for this documentary at Art Film Fest in 1997. The Award for the Best Newcomer was given by Geraldine Chaplin and Krzysztoff Zanussi. During her film studies she directed the award-winning short documentary Ottavio (together with Attila Kékesi) and the short film Melody of the street (1999).  Groó earned her MA in film directing in 2000. After graduation she co-founded Katapult Film Production company along with her director fellows (Ferenc Török, György Pálfi, Szabolcs Hajdu, Bence Miklauzic, Dániel Erdélyi, Gábor Fischer, Csaba Fazekas). Between 2001-2006 she turned to making experimental animation and she directed Wild Imagination an experimental art-history series about Marc Chagall, P. Auguste Renoir, Henrie Rousseau, Pieter Bruegel and Lajos Gulácsy. In 2005 the first four episodes of the series opened the contemporary art exhibition of Herzliya Museum of Contemporary Art. The series was selected into the InterMedia courses of Haifa University along with the works of Peter Greenaway, Derek Jarman and others.  

Her feature debut, Miracle in Cracow (2004) a piece of Jewish magical realism (starring Jerzy Trela, Franciszek Pieczka, Stanisława Celińska , Itala Békés, Eszter Bíró, Maceiej Adamczyk) was co-produced by Krzysztof Zanussi. Her second feature film, Vespa (2010), a Hungarian-Serbian road movie featuring a Romani teenager won the Unicef Award of Terra di Siena Film Festival, the Dialogue Prize for Intercultural Communication at the Filmfestival Cottbus and the Prix du Reflet d’Or for best direction at the Geneva International Film Festival Cinema Tous Ecrans. Groó's poetic documentary Regina (2013) based on a single photograph tells the story of Regina Jonas, the world's first woman rabbi. Winner of the Lia Award at 30th Jerusalem Film Festival, the Warsaw Phoenix Award of Jewish Motifs International Film Festival (2014), Jury Award of 1.st Moscow Jewish Film Festival and featuring Rachel Weisz (English voiceover) and Martina Gedeck (German voiceover) as the voice of Regina Jonas. George Weisz the father of actress Rachel Weisz was the film's executive producer. Screened at the International Holocaust Remembrance Day at UNESCO (2014), at the Library of Congress (2014) and deposited in the Visual Center Collection at Yad Vashem.

In 2013 she co-founded DunaDock Master Class International Documentary Forum, along with Julianna Ugrin producer, Klára Trencsényi director and Ágnes Böjte executive producer.

Theatre 

In 2008 Diana directed Kathrine Kressmann Taylor's prophetic epistolary novel Address Unknown in Spinóza Theatre Budapest, which was staged first time in Hungary. The play ran for more than 8 years starring with János Kulka, Zsolt László and Kata Pető.

Filmography

References

External links 
 Regina movie
 

1973 births
Living people
Hungarian film directors
Hungarian women film directors